Forever Tour was the sixth headlining concert tour by American boy band, Big Time Rush. The tour began on June 23, 2022, in Oxon Hill, United States, and ended on March 5, 2023 in Rio de Janeiro, Brazil. The band announced the tour and its dates on February 21, 2022, with ticket presales starting on February 23. On March 8, 2022, it was confirmed that the band would be traveling all around the world in an announcement of three new shows in Mexico. The three newly added shows sold out in less than a day.

Opening acts
Dixie D'Amelio
Spencer Sutherland

Setlist 

 "Windows Down"
 "Music Sounds Better with U"
 "Honey"
 "Love Me Again (demo version)" 
 "Any Kind of Guy"
 "Amazing"
 "Call It Like I See It"
 "Show Me"
 "Not Giving You Up"
 "Halfway There"
 "Stuck"
 "No Idea"
 "Confetti Falling"
 "I Know You Know"
 "Worldwide"
 "Time of Our Life"
 "Paralyzed"
 "Fall"
 "City Is Ours" / "Big Night" / "Til I Forget About You"
 "Nothing Even Matters"
 "If I Ruled the World"
Encore
"Big Time Rush"
"Boyfriend"

Notes
 Before performing "I Know You Know" at each show, Big Time Rush would perform a medley of different songs with Carlos on the ukelele. Some of the songs they would perform included a variety of covers including "As It Was" and "Watermelon Sugar", and original songs including "Na Na Na", "Cover Girl", and the "Giant Turd" song from Big Time Rush.
 "Dale Pa' Ya" was first performed at the show in New York, NY. It was then performed at select dates, and permanently added to the setlist starting with the show in Rogers, AK.
 At the show in Philadelphia, PA, singer Rick Astley joined the band in a surprise appearance to cover his song "Never Gonna Give You Up"

Shows

Cancelled

References

External links
 Big Time Rush website

2022 concert tours
Big Time Rush concert tours